Esam Sakeen Al-Kandari (born 2 July 1971) is a Kuwaiti football midfielder who played for Kuwait in the 1996 Asian Cup. He also played for Kazma SC. He competed in the men's tournament at the 2000 Summer Olympics.

References

External links
 

1971 births
Living people
Kuwaiti footballers
Place of birth missing (living people)
1996 AFC Asian Cup players
2000 AFC Asian Cup players
Asian Games medalists in football
Footballers at the 1998 Asian Games
Asian Games silver medalists for Kuwait
Association football midfielders
Medalists at the 1998 Asian Games
Kuwait international footballers
Kuwait Premier League players
Kazma SC players
Olympic footballers of Kuwait
Footballers at the 2000 Summer Olympics